Clint Penzo is an American politician and businessman serving as a member of the Arkansas Senate representing the Springdale area. He previously served in the Arkansas House of Representatives from 2017 to 2023.

Early life and education 
Penzo was born in Tontitown, Arkansas. He earned an Associate of Applied Science in physical therapy from Northwest Arkansas Community College and a Bachelor of Science in geological and Earth sciences from the University of Arkansas.

Career 
From 2000 to 2005, Penzo worked as a physical therapy assistant at Encompass Health. He later became a real estate agent for Century 21. Penzo also owns Penzo Custom Homes, Penzo Roofing, and Penzo Real Estate. He served as a member of the Tontitown City Council for two years. Penzo was elected to the Arkansas House of Representatives in November 2016 and assumed office in January 2017. He also serves as vice chair of the Joint Energy Committee.

References 

Living people
People from Washington County, Arkansas
People from Springdale, Arkansas
Republican Party members of the Arkansas House of Representatives
American real estate businesspeople
Northwest Arkansas Community College alumni
University of Arkansas alumni
21st-century Mexican politicians
Year of birth missing (living people)